Soli Corbelle is an art dealer and gallerist.

Early life

A New York native, Soli was surrounded by art from a young age, growing up in a household of collectors and attending weekly history classes at the Metropolitan Museum of Art.

Career

Her early career began at the age of fifteen, garnering experience with a number of auction houses, museums and galleries including Phillips, Sotheby's, Marlborough Gallery and Museo Nacional Centro de Arte Reina Sofia. Her work extended to estates and artist studios by the likes of Manolo Valdes, Jack Tworkov, and Harry Bertoia.

At age twenty-five, Soli became a Director of the New York flagship of an international gallery with over 15 locations worldwide. Two years later, She left to work as a private advisor for distinguished collectors across the globe before launching her first gallery group, LUSH Art Agency, with locations in New York and Miami. She has since opened a second gallery group and non-profit called Gallery 23 NY.

References 

1991 births
Living people
People from New York City
University of San Francisco alumni
Women art dealers
American art dealers